Giovanni Targioni Tozzetti (Florence, 11 September 1712 - Florence, 7 January 1783) was an Italian botanist and naturalist.

Biography
He studied at the University of Pisa, and at the age of 22 was nominated to become professor. He  would move to Florence, where he joined the botanical society directed by Pier Antonio Micheli. He published observations on the cures of maladies with botanicals, and about the epidemic in 1752, and a grain disease in 1733 and 1766. 

He served the Tuscan Grand-Dukes as a doctor, and was appointed commissioner of sanitation in the program to vaccinate for smallpox. He was supervisor of the Orto Botanico di Firenze in Florence succeeded by Saverio Manetti. He had varied interests including writing about ways to prevent the Arno from flooding and about local archeologic artifacts.

Works

Among his publications were:
 
Relazione d'alcuni viaggi fatti in diverse parti della Toscana
Lista di notizie di storia naturale della Toscana
Prodromo della corografia e della topografia fisica della Toscana(1736)
Relazioni di alcuni innesti de vaiuolo (smallpox) fatti in Firenze 
 
Ragionamenti sopra le cause de i rimedi della insalubrita d'aria dell Valdinievole (1761)
Sitologia, o raccolta di osservazioni, esperienze e ragionamenti sopra la natura e qualita de grani e delle farine
Alimurgi, ossia modo di render meno gravi le carestie (famine)
Istruzioni circa la maniera di accrescere il pane con l'uso di alcune sostanze vegetabili (1767)
Disamine di alcuni progetti fatti nel sec XVI per salvar Firenze dalle inondazioni dell'Arno
Relazione delle febbri che si sono provate epidemiche in diversa parti della Toscana l'anno 1767
Raccolta di opuscoli medico-pratici
Raccolta di teorie, osservazioni, e regole per dissipare le asfissie
Notizie degli aggrandimenti delle scienze fisiche accaduti in Toscana nel corso di anni 60 nel seculo XVII
 

Apparently met Caso Umbria in the 1730s. After the age of catastrophic, to give strong evidence on geomorphological activities occurring on earth, he postulated that the irregular courses (symmetry and asymmetry of the valleys) of the rivers depended on the nature of rocks through which they flow. The regions of massive and resistant rocks maintain deep and narrow courses (valleys) whereas broad and meandering courses are developed in the regions of soft and less resistant rocks. Thus, this concept gives the glimpse of differential erosion.

References

External links

Italian naturalists
18th-century Italian botanists
Academic staff of the University of Pisa
1712 births
1783 deaths